Seraiah or Sraya (שְׂרָיָה "Soldier/Prince/Princess of/is the LORD", Standard Hebrew Səraya, Tiberian Hebrew Śərāyā) is the name of several people mentioned in the Hebrew Bible, and a name with other non-biblical uses.

Biblical characters

One of David's scribes or secretaries
See 2 Samuel .

High Priest 
Contemporary of Zedekiah. He was later carried captive by Nebuchadnezzar to Babylon, and there put to death (2 Kings )

Patrilineal Ancestry
As per 1 Chronicles chapter 5

Seraiah the son of Tanhumeth
(), one of the officials who survived the defeat and exile of Judea, a Netophathite (2 Kings ).

The father of Joab
Also son of Kenaz (1 Chronicles ). It is unlikely that this Joab is the son of Tsruiah, King David's sister, because the Seraiah mentioned in the Book of Chronicles was the brother of Othniel, the nephew of Caleb, who lived centuries earlier. , .

The grandfather of Jehu
Also father of Joshibiah and son of Asiel.

One of those who returned from exile

Father or ancestor of Ezra the scribe
Seraiah is named as the father of Ezra in Ezra's genealogy (Ezra ). The son of Azariah, the son of Hilkiah and brother of Jeremiah.

A ruler of the temple
(Nehemiah ).

An officer of King Jehoiakim
Son of Azriel (Jeremiah 36:26)

Seraiah ben Neriah
The son of Neriah. When Zedekiah made a journey to Babylon to do homage to Nebuchadnezzar, Seraiah had charge of the royal gifts to be presented on that occasion. Jeremiah took advantage of the occasion, and sent with Seraiah a word of cheer to the exiles in Babylon, and an announcement of the doom in store for that guilty city. Babylon was at this time in the height of its glory, the greatest and most powerful monarchy in the world. Scarcely seventy years elapsed when the words of the prophet were all fulfilled.  is rendered in the Revised Version, "Now Seraiah was chief chamberlain," instead of "was a quiet prince," as in the Authorized Version.

Others
Sariah - according to the Book of Mormon, the wife of Lehi, and the mother of Laman, Lemuel, Sam, and Nephi
Zrahia, a religious moshav in southern Israel. Located near Kiryat Malakhi, it falls under the jurisdiction of Shafir Regional Council. Named after Seraiah, the father of Ezra and one of the Jews who came to the Land of Israel after their Babylonian captivity

Contemporary
Serayah McNeill, American actress, singer

References

 Christian Classics Ethereal Library

Set index articles on Hebrew Bible people
Books of Kings people